Tongzi is a town in Wulong District, Chongqing, China. , it administers Tongxin Community and the following six villages: 
Tongzi Village
Xiangshu Village
Guantian Village
Fanrong Village
Changzheng Village
Shuangfeng Village

See also 
 List of township-level divisions of Chongqing

References 

Township-level divisions of Chongqing